The Scout and Guide movement in Algeria is served by
 Algerian Muslim Scouts, member of the World Organization of the Scout Movement
 Although Algeria does have a Guiding organization, work towards World Association of Girl Guides and Girl Scouts membership recognition remains unclear

See also

Algeria